Bojan Čiča (born 10 March 1996) is a former Serbian football defender.

Club career

Spartak Subotica
He made his Jelen SuperLiga debut for Spartak Subotica on away match versus Radnički Niš on 10 May 2014.

References

External links
 
 Bojan Čiča Stats at utakmica.rs
 Bojan Čiča Profile at Фудбалски савез Србије

1996 births
Living people
Sportspeople from Subotica
Association football defenders
Serbian footballers
FK Spartak Subotica players
Serbian SuperLiga players